The Short Bridge spans the South Santiam River  east of Sweet Home, Oregon, near the community of Cascadia. The  Howe truss type bridge was built in 1945. It is named for Gordon Short, a long-time area resident. The bridge is listed on the National Register of Historic Places.

See also
List of bridges documented by the Historic American Engineering Record in Oregon
List of bridges on the National Register of Historic Places in Oregon

References

External links

Bridges completed in 1945
Historic American Engineering Record in Oregon
National Register of Historic Places in Linn County, Oregon
Covered bridges on the National Register of Historic Places in Oregon
Bridges in Linn County, Oregon
1945 establishments in Oregon
Road bridges on the National Register of Historic Places in Oregon
Wooden bridges in Oregon
Howe truss bridges in the United States